Connole may refer to:

 Bruce Connole (born 1958), American singer, songwriter, and guitarist
 Jack Connole (1890-1958), Australian rules footballer
 USS Connole, a Knox-class frigate

See also
 Conole, a surname